The Kingdom of Musikot was a petty kingdom in the confederation of 24 states known as Chaubisi Rajya. Around 1787, Musikot was attacked by Damodar Pande who won the war subsequently it became part of the Kingdom of Nepal.

References 

Chaubisi Rajya
Musikot
Musikot
History of Nepal
Musikot
Musikot